Jon "Boog" Sciambi (born April 11, 1970) is an American sportscaster for ESPN and the Marquee Sports Network, currently the everyday play-by-play announcer for the Chicago Cubs TV broadcasts. He has worked extensively as a baseball play-by-play announcer, calling games for ESPN television and on ESPN Radio. Sciambi's nickname, "Boog," was given to him owing to his physical resemblance to former major league player Boog Powell.

Early life
Born in Philadelphia, Sciambi grew up on Roosevelt Island in New York City. He is a graduate of Regis High School in New York City and Boston College.

Career
As Sciambi attended Boston College, he began his sportscasting experience on WZBC, the school's 1000-watt FM radio station broadcasting to the Greater Boston area. Classmates and fellow broadcasters at WZBC included Joe Tessitore and Bob Wischusen, both of whom also went on to become successful sports announcers.

Sciambi was an announcer with the Florida Marlins from 1997 to 2004.

He was paired with Joe Simpson. Late in the 2009 season, it was announced that Sciambi would be leaving the Braves and joining ESPN's Major League Baseball and college basketball coverage full-time.

He formerly worked in South Florida sports radio on 790 The Ticket. Sciambi left the radio show on April 4, 2008, to focus on broadcasting for the Atlanta Braves. Prior to being on 790, Sciambi was a talk show host on WQAM for several years.

On January 4, 2021, Marquee Sports Network named Sciambi as play-by-play announcer for its Chicago Cubs telecasts following the resignation of the former play-by-play announcer, Len Kasper. He also continues to call regular-season and postseason games on ESPN Radio; in October 2022, it was announced that Sciambi will take over as the lead announcer for ESPN Radio's postseason coverage in the 2023 season, replacing Dan Shulman.

Sciambi succeeded Matt Vasgersian and took over the main play-by-play calls for the MLB: The Show video game series starting with MLB The Show 22. There is no information regarding whether or not he will come back for MLB The Show 23.

In October 2022, it was officially announced that Sciambi would succeed Dan Shulman as ESPN Radio's play-by-play announcer for the World Series beginning in 2023.

Philanthropy 
Sciambi has been involved in funding research of and direct care for victims of ALS, also known as Lou Gehrig's Disease. In 2006, Sciambi founded Project Main St. with Tim Sheehy, a friend who later died from the disease.

References

External links
 Baseball Prospectus Chat with Jon Sciambi
 ESPN bio
https://projectmainst.org/about-us/

1970 births
Living people
American people of Italian descent
American radio sports announcers
American television sports announcers
Atlanta Braves announcers
Boston College alumni
Chicago Cubs announcers
College basketball announcers in the United States
Florida Marlins announcers
Major League Baseball broadcasters
People from Roosevelt Island
Regis High School (New York City) alumni
Sportspeople from New York City
Sportspeople from Philadelphia
Women's college basketball announcers in the United States